Clara Williams Archilta (September 26, 1912–30 September 1994), was a Kiowa-Apache-Tonkawa painter and beadworker from the San Ildefonso Pueblo tribe. A self-taught artist with no formal art training, Archilta is known for her watercolor painting and her pictorial beadwork.

Clara Williams was born to David Williams (of the Tonkawa tribe) and Helen Tseeltsesah-Sunrise (Kiowa-Apache). She attended Boone School in Apache, Oklahoma, followed by two years at the U.S. Chilocco Indian School, ultimately received schooling through the eighth grade. She married Ward Archilta and had six children.

Her husband died in 1956, and Archilta began to paint the following year as a means to support her family. Despite a severely injured arm, she soon began to sell her work and make a name for herself. She was the first woman to exhibit a collection of paintings at the American Indian Exposition (Anadarko, Oklahoma). She also exhibited work at the Philbrook Art Center. Her work has been in the collection of the Bureau of Indian Affairs in Anadarko.

Archilta was also the head woman dancer for the Apache Blackfeet Society. In the late 1950s, she painted a rare version of the Kiowa-Apache Blackfeet Dance. In the painting the Manatidie dancers are depicted in an earlier version of the dance which was no longer performed after the early 1900s.

References 

1912 births
1994 deaths
20th-century indigenous people of the Americas
20th-century American women artists
20th-century indigenous painters of the Americas
Native American painters
Kiowa people
Apache people
Tonkawa
Native American women artists
Native American bead artists
American women painters
Painters from Oklahoma
Native American people from Oklahoma
Women beadworkers